The seventh and final season of the American television drama series Mad Men premiered on April 13, 2014, and concluded on May 17, 2015, on AMC. The season consists of 14 episodes split into two, seven-episode parts: the first half, titled "The Beginning", aired from April 13 to May 25, 2014; and the second half, titled "The End of an Era", aired from April 5 to May 17, 2015. The first part of the seventh season was released on Blu-ray/DVD on October 21, 2014, and the second half was released on October 13, 2015. Each episode in the season has a running time of approximately 48 minutes, with the exception of the final two episodes which are 54 and 57 minutes, respectively.

The first part of season 7 begins in January 1969, several weeks after the Thanksgiving 1968 ending of season 6, with characters dealing with the dynamics of lives and offices being split between New York and Los Angeles, and ends in July 1969. The second part of season 7 takes place between April and November 1970.

Cast

Main cast
Jon Hamm as Don Draper
Elisabeth Moss as Peggy Olson
Vincent Kartheiser as Pete Campbell
January Jones as Betty Francis
Christina Hendricks as Joan Harris
Aaron Staton as Ken Cosgrove
Rich Sommer as Harry Crane
Kiernan Shipka as Sally Draper
Jessica Paré as Megan Draper
Kevin Rahm as Ted Chaough
Christopher Stanley as Henry Francis
Jay R. Ferguson as Stan Rizzo
Ben Feldman as Michael Ginsberg
Mason Vale Cotton as Bobby Draper
Robert Morse as Bert Cooper
John Slattery as Roger Sterling

Recurring cast

Guest stars
Linda Cardellini as Sylvia Rosen
Rebecca Creskoff as Barbara Katz
Anne Dudek as Francine Hanson
Marten Holden Weiner as Glen Bishop
Rich Hutchman as Bud Campbell
Mark Moses as Herman "Duck" Phillips
Brian Markinson as Dr. Arnold Rosen
Larisa Oleynik as Cynthia Cosgrove
Maggie Siff as Rachel Katz (née Menken)
Ray Wise as Ed Baxter
James Wolk as Bob Benson

Episodes

Reception

Critical reception
The seventh season of Mad Men received general acclaim. The review aggregator Rotten Tomatoes reports that 87% of 52 critics reviewed the season favorably. The site's consensus is: "Just in time to rekindle viewers' interest, Mad Men gets back on track for one last season, revisiting its steady, deliberate pace and style on its way to a sure-to-be-compelling climax." On Metacritic, the first part of the seventh season scored 85 out of 100 based on 26 reviews; the second part scored 83 out of 100, based on 19 reviews, both indicating "universal acclaim".

Accolades
For the 66th Primetime Emmy Awards, the first half of the season was nominated for Outstanding Drama Series, Jon Hamm was nominated for Outstanding Lead Actor in a Drama Series, Christina Hendricks was nominated for Outstanding Supporting Actress in a Drama Series, and Robert Morse was nominated for Outstanding Guest Actor in a Drama Series. For the 67th Writers Guild of America Awards, the series was nominated for Best Drama Series and Jonathan Igla and Matthew Weiner were nominated for Best Episodic Drama for "A Day's Work".

For the 31st TCA Awards, the series was nominated for Program of the Year and Outstanding Achievement in Drama, and Hamm won for Individual Achievement in Drama. For the 67th Primetime Emmy Awards, Jon Hamm won for Outstanding Lead Actor in a Drama Series after eight consecutive nominations. The series received nominations for Outstanding Drama Series, Elisabeth Moss for Outstanding Lead Actress in a Drama Series, Christina Hendricks for Outstanding Supporting Actress in a Drama Series, Semi Chellas and Matthew Weiner for Outstanding Writing for a Drama Series for "Lost Horizon", and Weiner in the same category for "Person to Person". For the 68th Writers Guild of America Awards, the series won for Best Drama and Matthew Weiner was nominated for Best Episodic Drama for "Person to Person". For the 22nd Screen Actors Guild Awards, the cast was nominated for Best Drama Ensemble and Jon Hamm was nominated for Best Drama Actor. For the 73rd Golden Globe Awards, Jon Hamm won for Best Drama Actor. For the 68th Directors Guild of America Awards, Matthew Weiner was nominated for Outstanding Directing – Drama Series for "Person to Person".

References

External links

2014 American television seasons
2015 American television seasons
 
Television series set in 1969
Television series set in 1970
Split television seasons